R. Kamalakkannan is an Indian politician belonging to the Indian National Congress. He was elected from the Thirunallar constituency in 2016 Puducherry Legislative Assembly election. He became the minister of Agriculture, Electricity, Education including Collegiate Education, DRDA, Community Development, Fire Services and
Sainik Welfare in V. Narayanasamy government.

References

Indian National Congress politicians from Puducherry
Puducherry politicians
Living people
State cabinet ministers of Puducherry
Year of birth missing (living people)
Puducherry MLAs 2016–2021